Criticism of Muhammad has existed since the 7th century AD, when Muhammad was decried by his Non-Muslim Arab contemporaries for preaching monotheism, and by the Jewish tribes of Arabia for what they claimed were unwarranted appropriation of Biblical narratives and figures and vituperation of the Jewish faith. For these reasons, medieval Jewish writers commonly referred to him by the derogatory nickname ha-Meshuggah ("the Madman" or "the Possessed").

During the Middle Ages, various Western and Byzantine Christian thinkers considered Muhammad to be a perverted, deplorable man, a false prophet, and even the Antichrist, as he was frequently seen in Christendom as a heretic or possessed by demons. Some of them, like Thomas Aquinas, criticized Muhammad's handling of doctrinal matters and his promises of carnal pleasure in the afterlife.

Modern criticism has concerned Muhammad's sincerity as a prophet, his morality, his marriages, his ownership of slaves and his psychological condition. Muhammad has also been accused of sadism and cruelty in the treatment of his enemies, including in the invasion of the Banu Qurayza tribe in Medina.

History of criticism

Early Middle Ages

The earliest documented Christian knowledge of Muhammad stems from Byzantine sources, written shortly after Muhammad's death in 632. In the Doctrina Jacobi nuper baptizati, a dialogue between a recent Christian convert and several Jews, one participant writes that his brother "wrote to [him] saying that a deceiving prophet has appeared amidst the Saracens".  Another participant in the Doctrina replies about Muhammad: "He is deceiving. For do prophets come with sword and chariot?, …[Y]ou will discover nothing true from the said prophet except human bloodshed". Another Greek source for Muhammad is Theophanes the Confessor, a 9th-century writer. The earliest Syriac source is the 7th-century writer John bar Penkaye.

One Christian who came under the early dominion of the Islamic Caliphate was John of Damascus (c. 676–749 AD), who was familiar with Islam and Arabic. The second chapter of his book, The Fount of Wisdom, titled "Concerning Heresies", presents a series of discussions between Christians and Muslims. John claimed that an Arian monk (whom he did not know was Bahira) influenced Muhammad and the writer viewed the Islamic doctrines as nothing more than a hodgepodge culled from the Bible.

Among the first sources representing Muhammad is the polemical work "Concerning Heresy" (Perì hairéseōn) of John of Damascus, translated from Greek into Latin. In this manuscript, the Syrian priest represents Muhammad as a "false prophet," and an "Antichrist". Some demonstrate that Muhammad was pointed out in this manuscript as "Mamed", but this study was corrected by Ahlam Sbaihat who affirmed that it is the form ΜΩΑΜΕθ (Moameth) which is mentioned in this manuscript. The phoneme h and the gemination of m do not exist in Greek so it has disappeared from John's uses.

From the 9th century onwards, highly negative biographies of Muhammad were written in Latin, such as the one by Álvaro of Córdoba proclaiming him the Antichrist. Since the 7th century, Muhammad and his name have been connected to several stereotypes. Many sources mentioned exaggerated and sometimes wrong stereotypes. These stereotypes are born in the East but adopted by or developed in Western cultures. These references played a principal role in introducing Muhammad and his religion to the West as the false prophet, Saracen prince or deity, the Biblical beast, a schismatic from Christianity and a satanic creature, and the Antichrist.

Middle Ages

During the 12th century Peter the Venerable, who saw Muhammad as the precursor to the Anti-Christ and the successor of Arius, ordered the translation of the Qur'an into Latin (Lex Mahumet pseudoprophete) and the collection of information on Muhammad so that Islamic teachings could be refuted by Christian scholars. During the 13th century a series of works by European scholars such as Pedro Pascual, Ricoldo de Monte Croce, and Ramon Llull depicted Muhammad as an Antichrist and argued that Islam was a Christian heresy.

According to Hossein Nasr, the earliest European literature often refers to Muhammad unfavorably. A few learned circles of Middle Ages Europeprimarily Latin-literate scholarshad access to fairly extensive biographical material about Muhammad. They interpreted the biography through a Christian religious filter, one that viewed Muhammad as a person who seduced the Saracens into his submission under religious guise. Popular European literature of the time portrayed Muhammad as though he were worshipped by Muslims, similar to an idol or a heathen god.

In later ages, Muhammad came to be seen as a schismatic: Brunetto Latini's 13th century Li livres dou tresor represents him as a former monk and cardinal, and Dante's Divine Comedy (Inferno, Canto 28), written in the early 1300s, puts Muhammad and his son-in-law, Ali, in Hell "among the sowers of discord and the schismatics, being lacerated by devils again and again."

The fact that Muhammad was unlettered, that he married a wealthy widow, that in his later life he had several wives, that he ruled over a human community, was involved in several wars, and that he died like an ordinary person in contrast to the Christian belief in the supernatural end of Christ's earthly life were all arguments used to discredit Muhammad. One common allegation laid against Muhammad was that he was an impostor who, in order to satisfy his ambition and his lust, propagated religious teachings that he knew to be false.

Some medieval ecclesiastical writers portrayed Muhammad as possessed by Satan, a "precursor of the Antichrist" or the Antichrist himself. In Dante's The Divine Comedy, Muhammad dwells in the 9th Bolgia of the Eighth Circle of Hell and is depicted as disemboweled; the contrapasso represented thereby implicates Muhammad as a schismatic, figuratively rending the body of the Catholic Church and compromising the integrity of the truth of Christianity in the same way Muhammad's body is depicted as literally wounded.

A more positive interpretation appears in the 13th-century Estoire del Saint Grail, the first book in the vast Arthurian cycle, the Lancelot-Grail. In describing the travels of Joseph of Arimathea, keeper of the Holy Grail, the author says that most residents of the Middle East were pagans until the coming of Muhammad, who is shown as a true prophet sent by God to bring Christianity to the region. This mission however failed when Muhammad's pride caused him to alter God's wishes, thereby deceiving his followers. Nevertheless, Muhammad's religion is portrayed as being greatly superior to paganism.

The Tultusceptru de libro domni Metobii, an Andalusian manuscript with unknown dating, recounts how Muhammad (called Ozim, from Hashim) was tricked by Satan into adulterating an originally pure divine revelation. The story argues God was concerned about the spiritual fate of the Arabs and wanted to correct their deviation from the faith. He then sends an angel to the monk Osius who orders him to preach to the Arabs.

Osius however is in ill-health and orders a young monk, Ozim, to carry out the angel's orders instead. Ozim sets out to follow his orders, but gets stopped by an evil angel on the way. The ignorant Ozim believes him to be the same angel that spoke to Osius before. The evil angel modifies and corrupts the original message given to Ozim by Osius, and renames Ozim Muhammad. From this followed the erroneous teachings of Islam, according to the Tultusceptru.

Jewish criticism

In the Middle Ages, it was common for Jewish writers to describe Muhammad as ha-Meshuggah ("The Madman"), a term of contempt frequently used in the Bible for those who believe themselves to be prophets.

Thomas Aquinas
Thomas Aquinas was highly critical of Muhammad's character and ethics, claiming that his teachings were largely in conformity to his immoral lifestyle. He wrote in Summa Contra Gentiles:

""[Muhammad] seduced the people by promises of carnal pleasure to which the concupiscence of the flesh goads us. His teaching also contained precepts that were in conformity with his promises, and he gave free rein to carnal pleasure. In all this, as is not unexpected, he was obeyed by carnal men. As for proofs of the truth of his doctrine, he brought forward only such as could be grasped by the natural ability of anyone with a very modest wisdom... Nor do divine pronouncements on the part of preceding prophets offer him any witness. On the contrary, he perverts almost all the testimonies of the Old and New Testaments by making them into fabrications of his own, as can be seen by anyone who examines his law. It was, therefore, a shrewd decision on his part to forbid his followers to read the Old and New Testaments, lest these books convict him of falsity. It is thus clear that those who place any faith in his words believe foolishly".

Voltaire

Mahomet (French: Le fanatisme, ou Mahomet le Prophète, literally "Fanaticism, or Mahomet the Prophet") is a five-act tragedy written in 1736 by French playwright and philosopher Voltaire. It made its debut performance in Lille on 25 April 1741. The play is a study of religious fanaticism and self-serving manipulation based on an episode in the traditional biography of Muhammad in which he orders the murder of his critics. Voltaire described the play as "written in opposition to the founder of a false and barbarous sect to whom could I with more propriety inscribe a satire on the cruelty and errors of a false prophet".

In a letter to Frederick II of Prussia in 1740 Voltaire ascribes to Muhammad a brutality that "is assuredly nothing any man can excuse" and suggests that his following stems from superstition and lack of Enlightenment. He wanted to portray Muhammad as "Tartuffe with a sword in his hand."

According to Malise Ruthven, Voltaire's view became more positive as he learned more about Islam.
As a result, his book, Fanaticism (Mohammad the Prophet), inspired Goethe, who was attracted to Islam, to write a drama on this theme, though completed only the poem Mahomets-Gesang ("Mahomet's Singing").

Modern times
Modern critics have criticized Muhammad for preaching beliefs that are incompatible with democracy; Somali-Dutch feminist writer Ayaan Hirsi Ali has called him a "tyrant" and a "pervert".

Neuroscientist and prominent ideological critic Sam Harris contrasts the example of Muhammad with that of Jesus Christ. While he regards Christ as something of a "hippie" figure, Muhammad is an altogether different character and one whose example "as held in Islam is universally not [that of] a pacifist," but rather one of a "conquering warlord who spread the faith by the sword." Harris notes that while sayings such as "render unto Caesar that which is Caesar's" provide Christianity with a "rationale for peace," it is impossible to justify non-violence as central to Islam. Harris says that the example of Muhammad provides an imperative to "convert, subjugate, or kill" and "the core principle of Islam is Jihad." Harris also suggests that Muhammad "may well have been schizophrenic," dismissing Muhammad's claim that the Koran was dictated to him by the archangel Gabriel.

American historian Daniel Pipes sees Muhammad as a politician, stating that "because Muhammad created a new community, the religion that was its raison d'être had to meet the political needs of its adherents."

In 2012 a film titled Innocence of Muslims and alternatively The Real Life of Muhammad and Muhammad Movie Trailer was released by Nakoula Basseley Nakoula. A Vanity Fair article described the video as "Exceptionally amateurish, with disjointed dialogue, jumpy editing, and performances that would have looked melodramatic even in a silent movie, the clip is clearly designed to offend Muslims, portraying Mohammed as a bloodthirsty murderer and Lothario and pedophile with omnidirectional sexual appetites." Reacting to the release of the film, violent demonstrations and attacks targeted western institutions through the Muslim world.

In the early 20th century Western scholarly views of Muhammad changed, including critical views. In the 1911 Catholic Encyclopedia Gabriel Oussani states that Muhammad was inspired by an "imperfect understanding" of Judaism and Christianity, but that the views of Luther and those who call Muhammad a "wicked impostor", a "dastardly liar" and a "willful deceiver" are an "indiscriminate abuse" and "unsupported by facts." Instead, 19th-century Western scholars such as Aloys Sprenger, Theodor Noldeke, Gustav Weil, William Muir, Sigismund Koelle,  and D.S. Margoliouth "give us a more correct and unbiased estimate of Muhammad's life and character, and substantially agree as to his motives, prophetic call, personal qualifications, and sincerity."

Muir, Marcus Dods and others have suggested that Muhammad was at first sincere, but later became deceptive. Koelle finds "the key to the first period of Muhammad's life in Khadija, his first wife," after whose death he became prey to his "evil passions." Samuel Marinus Zwemer, a Christian missionary, criticised the life of Muhammad by the standards of the Old and New Testaments, by the pagan morality of his Arab compatriots, and last, by the new law which he brought. Quoting Johnstone, Zwemer concludes by claiming that his harsh judgment rests on evidence which "comes all from the lips and the pens of his [i.e. Muhammad's] own devoted adherents."

Martin Luther referred to Muhammad as "a devil and first-born child of Satan." Luther's primary target of criticism at the time was the Pope, and Luther's characterization of Muhammad was intended to draw a comparison to show that the Pope was worse.

Secular criticism

Many early former Muslims such as Ibn al-Rawandi, Al-Ma'arri, and Abu Isa al-Warraq were famous religious skeptics, polymaths, and philosophers who criticized Islam, the alleged authority and reliability of the Qu'ran, Muhammad's morality, and his claims to be a prophet.

The Quran also mentions critics of Muhammad; for example  says the critics complained that Muhammad was passing off what others were telling him as revelations:
The disbelievers say, “This ˹Quran˺ is nothing but a fabrication which he made up with the help of others.” Their claim is totally unjustified and untrue! And they say, “˹These revelations are only˺ ancient fables which he has had written down, and they are rehearsed to him morning and evening.”

Hindu criticism

In his 1875 work Satyarth Prakash, Dayanand Saraswati, the founder of Arya Samaj, quoted and interpreted several verses of the Koran and described Muhammad as "pugnacious", an "imposter", and one who held out "a bait to men and women, in the name of God, to compass his own selfish needs." Swami Vivekananda wrote in his 1896 book Raja Yoga that though Muhammad was inspired, "he was not a trained Yogi, nor did he know the reason of what he was doing." Vivekananda wrote that great evil has been done through Muhammad's fanaticism with "whole countries destroyed" and "millions upon millions of people killed."

In the 1920s, three caricatures published by Hindus attacked Muhammad and marriages—the book Vichitra Jivan (meaning Strange Life) by Pandit Kalicharan Sharma in 1923, the pamphlet Rangila Rasul (meaning The Colourful Prophet) by an anonymous author going by the pseudonym of Pandit Chamupati in 1924, and the essay Sair-i-Dozakh (meaning The Trip to Hell) by Devi Sharan Sharma in 1927. In Vichitra Jivan, Sharma wrote that Muhammad fell victim to many evils, all his marriages were extraordinary and improper, and that he suffered from epilepsy.

Sharma examined in detail the "marvelous powers" of Muhammad, the "products of his body", and every feature of his "marital and sexual relations", and ended the book by saying that such a person could not have been a divine messenger. The Sair-i-Dozakh was a take on the Isra and Mi'raj, Muhammad's journey to heaven and hell according to Islamic traditions. Described as a "brutal satire" by Gene Thursby, it described a dream purportedly experienced by the author in which he mounts a mysterious animal and sees various Hindu and Sikh deities and Gurus in the realm of salvation.

Points of contention

Ownership of slaves

Sociologist Rodney Stark argues that "the fundamental problem facing Muslim theologians vis-à-vis the morality of slavery is that "Muhammad bought, sold, captured, and owned slaves", and that his followers saw him as the perfect example to emulate. Stark contrasts Islam with Christianity, writing that Christian theologians wouldn't have been able to "work their way around the biblical acceptance of slavery" if Jesus had owned slaves, as Muhammad did.

Slavery existed in pre-Islamic Arabia, and Muhammad never expressed any intention of abolishing the practice, as he saw it "as part of the natural order of things". He did want to improve the condition of slaves, and exhorted his followers to treat them more humanely, i.e., as human beings as well as property, with kindness and compassion.

His decrees greatly limited those who could be enslaved and under what circumstances (including barring Muslims from enslaving other Muslims), allowed slaves to achieve their freedom and made freeing slaves a virtuous act. He made it legal for his men to marry their slaves and their concubines they captured in war. Muhammad would send his companions like Abu Bakr and Uthman ibn Affan to buy slaves to free. Many early converts to Islam were the poor and former slaves like Bilal ibn Rabah al-Habashi.

Treatment of enemies

Norman Geisler accuses Muhammad of "mercilessness" towards the Jewish tribes of Medina. Geisler also argues that Muhammad "had no aversion to politically expedient assassinations", "was not indisposed to breaking promises when he found it advantageous" and "engaged in retaliation towards those who mocked him." The Orientalist William Muir, in assessing Muhammad's character, described him as cruel and faithless in dealing with his enemies.

Seyyed Hossein Nasr, Professor of Islamic studies at George Washington University, relates Jew's story a little different:

Jean de Sismondi suggests that Muhammad had a specific animosity against Jews, because of the few differences that separated two mostly similar cults. He is among the historians suggesting that he killed many Jews through supplice, whereas he was usually known for his clemency.

Jewish tribes of Medina

Muhammad has been often criticized outside of the Islamic world for his treatment of the Jewish tribes of Medina. An example is the mass killing of the men of the Banu Qurayza, a Jewish tribe of Medina. The tribe was accused of having engaged in treasonous agreements with the enemies besieging Medina in the Battle of the Trench in 627.

Ibn Ishaq writes that Muhammad approved the beheading of some 600–700 in all, with some saying as high as 800–900, who surrendered after a siege that lasted several weeks. (Also see Bukhari ) (Yusuf Ali notes that the Qur'an discusses this battle in verses   They were buried in a mass grave in the Medina market place, and the women and children were sold into slavery.

According to Norman Stillman, the incident cannot be judged by present-day moral standards. Citing Deut. 20:13–14 as an example, Stillman states that the slaughter of adult males and the enslavement of women and children—though no doubt causing bitter suffering—was common practice throughout the ancient world. According to Rudi Paret, adverse public opinion was more a point of concern to Muhammad when he had some date palms cut down during a siege, than after this incident. Esposito also argues that in Muhammad's time, traitors were executed and points to similar situations in the Bible. Esposito says that Muhammad's motivation was political rather than racial or theological; he was trying to establish Muslim dominance and rule in Arabia.

Some historians, such as W.N. Arafat and Barakat Ahmad, have disputed the historicity of the incident. Ahmad argues that only the leading members of the tribe were killed. Arafat argued based on accounts by Malik ibn Anas and Ibn Hajar that Ibn Ishaq gathered information from descendants of the Qurayza Jews, who exaggerated the details of the incident. He also maintained that not all adult males were killed but only those who actually fought in the battle, however, William Montgomery Watt described this argument as "not entirely convincing."

Rabbi Samuel Rosenblatt has said that Muhammad's policies were not directed exclusively against Jews (referring to his conflicts with Jewish tribes) and that Muhammad was more severe with his pagan Arab kinsmen.

Death of Kenana ibn al-Rabi

According to one account, after the last fort of the Jewish settlement called Khaybar was taken by Muhammad and his men, the chief of the Jews, called Kinana ibn al-Rabi, was asked by Muhammad to reveal the location of some hidden treasure. When he refused, Muhammad ordered a man to torture Kinana, and the man "kindled a fire with flint and steel on his chest until he was nearly dead." Kinana was then beheaded, and Muhammad took his young wife Safiyya as a concubine.

Critics take these events, especially the story of the torture of Kinana, to be another blot on Muhammad's character. Those few Western scholars who discuss the alleged torture of Kinana, like William Muir, have generally not questioned the validity of the story. Muslims generally dispute this incident. Some claim that this was yet another story that Ibn Ishaq heard second-hand from Jewish sources, casting doubt on its authenticity. Others argue that Kinana was killed in battle and never taken captive.

Muhammad's marriages

One of the popular historical criticisms of Muhammad in the West has been his polygynous marriages. According to American historian John Esposito, the Semitic cultures in general permitted polygamy (for example, the practice could be found in biblical and postbiblical Judaism); it was particularly a common practice among Arabs, especially among nobles and leaders.

Muslims have often pointed out that Muhammad married Khadija (a widow whose age is estimated to have been 40), when he was 25 years old, and remained monogamous to her for more than 24 years until she died. Norman Geisler frames Muhammad's marriages as a question of moral inconsistency, since Muhammad was unwilling to abide by the revealed limit of four wives that he enjoined on other men. Quran 33:50 states that the limit of four wives does not apply to Muhammad.

Muslims have generally responded that the marriages of Muhammad were not conducted to satisfy worldly desires or lusts, but rather they were done for a higher purpose and due to God's command. Medieval Sufi, Ibn Arabi, sees Muhammad's relationships with his wives as a proof of his superiority amongst men. John Esposito states that polygamy served multiple purposes, including solidifying political alliances among Arab chiefs and marrying widows of companions who died in combat that needed protection.

Contrary to Islamic law, Muhammed is accused of treating his wives unequally. He is accused of clearly favouring Aisha among his living wives, explicitly rated Khadija his best wife overall and had the Quranic dispensation to consort with his wives in an Islamically inequitable manner. These actions created jealousy and dissension among his wives and "illustrate the inability of husbands to give equal consideration to multiple wives."

Aisha

According to traditional sources, Aisha was six or seven years old when betrothed to Muhammad, with the marriage being consummated when she reached the age of nine or ten years old. Some modern Muslim authors who calculate Aisha's age based on other sources of information, such as a hadith about the age difference between Aisha and her sister Asma, estimate that she was over thirteen and could have been 18 or 19 at the time of her marriage. Beginning in the early twentieth century, Christian polemicists and orientalists would attack what they deem to be Muhammad's deviant sexuality, for having married an underage girl; acute condemnations came from the likes of Harvey Newcomb and David Samuel Margoliouth while others were mild, choosing to explain how the "heat of tropics" made "girls of Arabia" mature at an early age. As colonial governments sought to regulate the age of consent and conflicted with traditional legal systems (Sharia etc.), pointers to Aisha's age at marriage proliferated across the archives in explaining the backwardness of Muslim societies and their reticence to reforms. While most Muslims defended the traditionally accepted age of Aisha with vigor emphasizing on cultural relativism, the political dimensions of the marriage, Aisha's "exceptional qualities" etc., some — Abbas Mahmoud al-Aqqad in Egypt and others — chose to re-calculate the age and fix it at late adolescence as a tool of social reform in their homelands or even, mere pandering to different audiences. 

Across the late-twentieth century and early twentieth century, Aisha's age has become a tool of polemicists: accusations of pedophilia have been directed at Muhammad — not as a diagnostic category but as the highest category of evil — to account for the apparently higher prevalence of child marriage in Muslim societies etc.

Zaynab bint Jahsh

Western criticism has focused especially on the marriage of Muhammad to his first cousin Zaynab bint Jahsh, the divorced wife of Zayd ibn Harithah, an ex-slave whom Muhammad had adopted as his son. According to Tabari, taken from Al-Waqidi, the story goes that "One day Muhammad went out looking for Zayd. There was a covering of haircloth over the doorway, but the wind had lifted the covering so that the doorway was uncovered. Zaynab was in her chamber, undressed, and admiration for her entered the heart of the Prophet. After that Allah made her unattractive to Zayd and he divorced Zainab."

Karen Armstrong's 2006 biography of Muhammad contextualises this: "A pious woman, [Zaynab] was a skilled leather-worker and gave all the proceeds of her craft to the poor. Muhammad seems to have seen her with new eyes and to have fallen in love quite suddenly when he had called at her house one afternoon to speak to Zayd, who happened to be out. Not expecting any visitors, Zaynab had come to the door in dishabille, more revealingly dressed than usual, and Muhammad had averted his eyes hastily, muttering 'Praise be to Allah, who changes men's hearts!'"

According to William Montgomery Watt, Zaynab herself was working for marriage with Muhammad and was not happy being married to Zayd. Watt also places doubt on the story outlined by Al-Waqidi and states that it should be taken with a "grain of salt." According to Watt, Zaynab was either thirty-five or thirty-eight years old at the time and that the story initially outlined by Al-Waqidi in which he detailed Muhammad's incident with Zaynab during the absence of Zayd may have been tampered with in the course of transmission.

According to Mazheruddin Siddiqi, Zaynab as the cousin of Muhammad was seen by him many times before her marriage to Zayd. Siddiqi states: "He [Muhammad] had seen her many times before but he was never attracted to her physical beauty, else he would have married her, instead of insisting on her that she should marry Zaid."

The English translation of the book, The Wives of the Messenger of Allah by Muhammad Swaleh Awadh,  states that she was married to Muhammad in Dhul Qa'adah, in the fifth year of Hijra.  Since Zaynab was the wife of Muhammad's adopted son, pre-Islamic practices frowned upon such her marriage with the prophet.  Arab society would have viewed this union as profoundly wrong; because they considered an adopted son was truly a "son", for a man to marry his adopted son's wife—even if she was divorced—was considered wrong.

The marriage was used by Munafiqs of Medina to discredit Muhammad on two fronts, one of double standards as she was his fifth wife, while everyone else was restricted to four, and marrying his adopted son's wife.  This was exactly what Muhammad feared and was initially hesitant in marrying her.  The Qur'an, however, confirmed that this marriage was valid.  Thus Muhammad, confident of his faith in the Qur'an, proceeded to reject the existing Arabic norms.  When Zaynab's waiting period from her divorce was complete, Muhammad married her.  In reference to this incident,  says:

After this verse was announced, Muhammad proceeded to reject the existing Arabic norms on the prohibition to marry the wives of adopted sons, which was considered extremely wrong and incestuous among Arabs. Thereafter the legal status of adoption was not recognised under Islam. Zayd reverted to being known by his original name of "Zayd ibn Harithah" instead of "Zayd ibn Muhammad".

Orientalists and critics have pointed to this Sura as an example of a self-serving revelation that merely reflects Muhammad's own lust and sexual desires rather than the will of God.

Religious syncretism and compromise
John Mason Neale (1818–1866) accused Muhammad of pandering to his followers, arguing that he constructed Islam out of a mixture of beliefs that provided something for everyone.

Thomas Patrick Hughes (b. 1838) argued that the Hajj represents an expedient compromise between Muhammad's monotheistic principles and Arabian paganism.

Nasr, the Professor of Islamic studies at George Washington University, states: 

Islamic scholar Yasir Qadhi stated that while non-Muslims believe Muhammad "adopted certain things from paganism and then added his own two cents for us", he instead states that Muhammad resurrected the original teachings of the Islamic prophet Ibrahim, citing an Islamic narrative of a man named Amr Ibn Luhay who later introduced paganism in Arabia. Muḥammad ibn ʻAbd Allāh Azraqī mentions the story his book titled Kitāb akhbār Makkah.

Psychological and medical condition

Muhammad is reported to have had mysterious seizures at the moments of inspiration. According to Philip Schaff (1819–1893), during his revelations Muhammad "sometimes growled like a camel, foamed at his mouth, and streamed with perspiration." Welch, a scholar of Islamic studies, in the Encyclopedia of Islam states that the graphic descriptions of Muhammad's condition at these moments may be regarded as genuine, since they are unlikely to have been invented by later Muslims.

According to Welch, these seizures should have been the most convincing evidence for the superhuman origin of Muhammad's inspirations for people around him. Others adopted alternative explanations for these seizures and claimed that he was possessed, a soothsayer, or a magician. Welch states it remains uncertain whether Muhammad had such experiences before he began to see himself as a prophet and if so how long did he have such experiences.

According to Temkin, the first attribution of epileptic seizures to Muhammad comes from the 8th century Byzantine historian Theophanes who wrote that Muhammad's wife "was very much grieved that she, being of noble descent, was tied to such a man, who was not only poor but epileptic as well." In the Middle Ages, the general perception of those who suffered epilepsy was an unclean and incurable wretch who might be possessed by the Devil. The political hostility between Islam and Christianity contributed to the continuation of the accusation of epilepsy throughout the Middle Ages. The Christian minister Archdeacon Humphrey Prideaux gave the following description of Muhammad's visions:
 He pretended to receive all his revelations from the Angel Gabriel, and that he
was sent from God of purpose to deliver them unto him. And whereas he was subject to the falling-sickness, whenever the fit was upon him, he pretended it to be a Trance, and that the Angel Gabriel comes from God with some Revelations unto him.

Some modern Western scholars also have a skeptical view of Muhammad's seizures. Frank R. Freemon states Muhammad had "conscious control over the course of the spells and can pretend to be in a religious trance." During the nineteenth century, as Islam was no longer a political or military threat to Western society, and perceptions of epilepsy changed, the theological and moral associations with epilepsy were removed; epilepsy was now viewed as a medical disorder. Nineteenth-century orientalist Margoliouth claimed that Muhammad suffered from epilepsy and even occasionally faked it for effect.

Sprenger attributes Muhammad's revelations to epileptic fits or a "paroxysm of cataleptic insanity." In Schaff's view, Muhammad's "early and frequent epileptic fits" provided "some light on his revelations." The most famous epileptic of the 19th century, Fyodor Dostoyevsky (1821–1881) wrote that epileptic attacks have an inspirational quality; he said they are "a supreme exaltation of emotional subjectivity" in which time stands still. Dostoyevsky claimed that his own attacks were similar to those of Muhammad: "Probably it was of such an instant, that the epileptic Mahomet was speaking when he said that he had visited all the dwelling places of Allah within a shorter time than it took for his pitcher full of water to empty itself."

In an essay that discusses views of Muhammad's psychology, Franz Bul (1903) is said to have observed that "hysterical natures find unusual difficulty and often complete inability to distinguish the false from the true", and to have thought this to be "the safest way to interpret the strange inconsistencies in the life of the Prophet." In the same essay Duncan Black Macdonald (1911) is credited with the opinion that "fruitful investigation of the Prophet's life (should) proceed upon the assumption that he was fundamentally a pathological case."

Modern Western scholars of Islam have rejected the diagnosis of epilepsy. Tor Andrae rejects the idea that the inspired state is pathological attributing it to a scientifically superficial and hasty theory arguing that those who consider Muhammad epileptic should consider all types of semi-conscious and trance-like states, occasional loss of consciousness, and similar conditions as epileptic attacks. Andrae writes that "[i]f epilepsy is to denote only those severe attacks which involve serious consequences for the physical and mental health, then the statement that Mohammad suffered from epilepsy must be emphatically rejected." Caesar Farah suggests that "[t]hese insinuations resulted from the 19th-century infatuation with scientifically superficial theories of medical psychology." Noth, in the Encyclopedia of Islam, states that such accusations were a typical feature of medieval European Christian polemic.

Maxime Rodinson says that it is most probable that Muhammad's conditions was basically of the same kind as that found in many mystics rather than epilepsy. Fazlur Rahman refutes epileptic fits for the following reasons: Muhammad's condition begins with his career at the age of 40; according to the tradition seizures are invariably associated with the revelation and never occur by itself. Lastly, a sophisticated society like the Meccan or Medinese would have identified epilepsy clearly and definitely.

William Montgomery Watt also disagrees with the epilepsy diagnosis, saying that "there are no real grounds for such a view." Elaborating, he says that "epilepsy leads to physical and mental degeneration, and there are no signs of that in Muhammad." He then goes further and states that Muhammad was psychologically sound in general: "he (Muhammad) was clearly in full possession of his faculties to the very end of his life." Watt concludes by stating "It is incredible that a person subject to epilepsy, or hysteria, or even ungovernable fits of emotion, could have been the active leader of military expeditions, or the cool far-seeing guide of a city-state and a growing religious community; but all this we know Muhammad to have been."

According to Seyyed Hossein Nasr, Muhammad's sense of fairness and justice was famous, even before his claim of prophet-hood, as people called him al-Amin, the trusted one.

Frank R. Freemon (1976) thinks that the above reasons given by modern biographers of Muhammad in rejection of epilepsy come from the widespread misconceptions about the various types of epilepsy. In his differential diagnosis, Freemon rejects schizophrenic hallucinations, drug-induced mental changes such as might occur after eating plants containing hallucinogenic materials, transient ischemic attacks, hypoglycemia, labyrinthitis, Ménière's disease, or other inner ear maladies.

At the end, Freemon argues that if one were forced to make a diagnosis psychomotor seizures of temporal lobe epilepsy would be the most tenable one, although our lack of scientific as well as historical knowledge makes unequivocal decision impossible. Freemon cites evidences supporting and opposing this diagnosis. In the end, Freemon points out that a medical diagnosis should not ignore Muhammad's moral message because it is just as likely, perhaps more likely, for God communicate with a person in an abnormal state of mind.

From a Muslim point of view, Freemon says, Muhammed's mental state at the time of revelation was unique and is not therefore amenable to medical or scientific discourse. In reaction to Freemon's article, GM. S. Megahed, a Muslim neurologist criticized the article arguing that there are no scientific explanations for many religious phenomena, and that if Muhammad's message is a result of psychomotor seizures, then on the same basis Moses' and Jesus' message would be the result of psychomotor seizures. In response, Freemon attributed such negative reactions to his article to the general misconceptions about epilepsy as a demeaning condition. Freemon said that he did plan to write an article on the inspirational spells of St. Paul, but the existence of such misconceptions caused him to cancel it.

Neglected legacy
Muhammad has been criticized for several omissions during his prophethood: he left the Muslim community leaderless and divided following his death by failing to clearly and indisputably declare the individual, selection process or institution that should succeed him, he failed to collect the Quran in a definitive text (later achieved during Uthman's Caliphate), and he failed to collect and codify his prophetic tradition, which work was later undertaken by scholars in the 8th and 9th centuries and became the second most important source of Islam's teachings.

According to both Sunni and Shia Muslims, on his way back from his last pilgrimage to Mecca, Muhammad stopped in a place called Ghadir Khumm, and appointed his cousin Ali as his executor of his last will and his Wali. The word Wali was interpreted differently by Sunni and Shia Muslims. Shia believes Muhammad appointed Ali as his successors at the location. Shia also believe Muhammad's Ahl al-Bayt, are the trusted collectors and transmitters of Muhammad's ahadith and trusted interpreters of Quran.

Tribalism
By stating that Muslims should perpetually be ruled by a member of his own Quraysh tribe after him, Muhammed is accused of creating an Islamic aristocracy, contrary to the religion's ostensibly egalitarian principles. In this reckoning, he introduced a hereditary elite topped by his own family and descendants (the Ahlul Bayt and sayyids), followed by his clan (Banu Hashim) then tribe (Quraysh).

Criticism of Muhammad's personal motivations

19th century and early 20th century 

William Muir, like many other 19th-century scholars divides Muhammad's life into two periods—Meccan and Medinan. He asserts that "in the Meccan period of [Muhammad's] life there certainly can be traced no personal ends or unworthy motives," painting him as a man of good faith and a genuine reformer. However, that all changed after the Hijra, according to Muir. "There [in Medina] temporal power, aggrandisement, and self-gratification mingled rapidly with the grand object of the Prophet's life, and they were sought and attained by just the same instrumentality." From that point on, he accuses Muhammad of manufacturing "messages from heaven" in order to justify a lust for women and reprisals against enemies, among other sins.

Philip Schaff says that "in the earlier part of his life he [Muhammad] was a sincere reformer and enthusiast, but after the establishment of his kingdom a slave of ambition for conquest" and describes him as "a slave of sensual passion." William St. Clair Tisdall also accused Muhammad of inventing revelations to justify his own desires.

D.S. Margoliouth, another 19th-century scholar, sees Muhammad as a charlatan who beguiled his followers with techniques like those used by fraudulent mediums today. He has expressed a view that Muhammad faked his religious sincerity, playing the part of a messenger from God like a man in a play, adjusting his performances to create an illusion of spirituality. Margoliouth is especially critical of the character of Muhammad as revealed in Ibn Ishaq's famous biography, which he holds as especially telling because Muslims cannot dismiss it as the writings of an enemy:

Late 20th century 

According to William Montgomery Watt and Richard Bell, recent writers have generally dismissed the idea that Muhammad deliberately deceived his followers, arguing that Muhammad "was absolutely sincere and acted in complete good faith". According to Nasr, 

Modern secular historians generally decline to address the question of whether the messages Muhammad reported being revealed to him were from "his unconscious, the collective unconscious functioning in him, or from some divine source", but they acknowledge that the material came from "beyond his conscious mind." Watt says that sincerity does not directly imply correctness: In contemporary terms, Muhammad might have mistaken for divine revelation his own unconscious. William Montgomery Watt states:

Rudi Paret agrees, writing that "Muhammad was not a deceiver," and Welch also holds that "the really powerful factor in Muhammad's life and the essential clue to his extraordinary success was his unshakable belief from beginning to end that he had been called by God. A conviction such as this, which, once firmly established, does not admit of the slightest doubt, exercises an incalculable influence on others. The certainty with which he came forward as the executor of God's will gave his words and ordinances an authority that proved finally compelling."

Bernard Lewis, another modern historian, commenting on the common Western Medieval view of Muhammad as a self-seeking impostor, states that

Watt rejects the idea that Muhammad's moral behavior deteriorated after he migrated to Medina. He argues that "it is based on too facile a use of the principle that all power corrupts and absolute power corrupts absolutely". Watt interprets incidents in the Medinan period in such a way that they mark "no failure in Muhammad to live to his ideals and no lapse from his moral principles."

See also

References

Footnotes

Notes

Citations

Criticism of Islam
Muhammad
Muhammad
Islam-related controversies